Stanley Stephen College of Engineering & Technology is established in the year 2007. It is located in the outskirts of Kurnool, Andhra Pradesh, India.

The College is approved by AICTE, New Delhi and is affiliated to Jawaharlal Nehru Technological University, Anantapur.

External links

Engineering colleges in Andhra Pradesh
Universities and colleges in Kurnool district
Kurnool
Educational institutions established in 2007
2007 establishments in Andhra Pradesh